State Highway 8 (SH-8) is an Idaho state highway in Latah and Clearwater counties, running from the Washington state line in Moscow to Elk River.

Route description
SH-8 begins at the Washington state line, connecting with Washington State Route 270 to Pullman. Between the cities to the north is the Pullman-Moscow Regional Airport.

In Moscow, Highway 8 runs east along the northern boundary of the University of Idaho campus as Pullman Road (widened to five lanes in 1996–97), enters an "S" curve, and becomes Third Street. It briefly overlaps US 95, and runs south through the city center (one ways (since 1981): Jackson Street southbound and Washington Street northbound, a block on either side of Main). South of downtown, SH-8 branches east to become the "Troy Highway" and heads out to Troy, where it intersects SH-99. 

East of Troy, SH-8 heads generally northeast, intersecting SH-9 shortly before entering Deary and overlapping SH-3 there.  From Deary, the overlapping highways run east and northeast to Bovill, where they diverge.

From Bovill, SH-8 heads south and southeast into Clearwater County.  It then turns east and northeast into Elk River, where it ends at the intersection of First and Main Streets.

Associated trails
For non-motorized traffic, Highway 8 is paralleled to the south by a series of paved trails from the state line to Troy, on former railroad corridors.  The Bill Chipman Palouse Trail originates in Pullman, gradually ascends alongside Paradise Creek, and terminates a mile into Idaho at Perimeter Road. There it links with Moscow's Paradise Path, which continues alongside the creek on the north and east edges of the UI campus; it connects to the Latah Trail in southeast Moscow and then travels through open Palouse country to Troy.

Major intersections

See also

 List of state highways in Idaho

References

External links

008
Transportation in Latah County, Idaho
Transportation in Clearwater County, Idaho